Oleg Ivanovich Korol (born 7 November 1969) is a Belarusian professional football coach and former player.

References

External links

Oleg Korol's profile at 11v11.com
Profile at BATE Borisov website

1969 births
Living people
Sportspeople from Brest, Belarus
Belarusian footballers
Soviet footballers
Belarus international footballers
Belarusian expatriate footballers
Belarusian expatriate sportspeople in Greece
Expatriate footballers in Greece
Belarusian expatriate sportspeople in Hungary
Expatriate footballers in Hungary
Belarusian expatriate sportspeople in Slovakia
Expatriate footballers in Slovakia
FC DAC 1904 Dunajská Streda players
Slovak Super Liga players
Association football defenders
Ferencvárosi TC footballers
Gázszer FC footballers
FC BATE Borisov players
Belarusian football managers
FC Volna Pinsk managers
FC Granit Mikashevichi managers
FC Slonim-2017 managers
FC Baranovichi managers